Americans Before Columbus  by Elizabeth Baity is a children's book about the history of pre-Columbian cultures in America illustrated by C. B. Falls. It was published in 1951 and was a Newbery Honor recipient in 1952. In the book, Elizabeth Chesley Baity talks about the history of the tribes of people in South and Meso-Americas from the time of the Ice Age when they crossed the Bering Strait up until Spain's arrival. The author gives insight through the archaeologists findings on how each individual culture of American Indian lived, what their history was and what became of them. Focusing on the Aztecs, the Mayans, the Iroquois, the Incas and the different important builders and people throughout the continents, she teaches about each individual group and compares them to the readers modern life. Though some of the information is outdated now, it is inundated with information and written for children to begin them on the path towards history and archaeology.

Summary
Americans Before Columbus begins with discussing the Ice Age and how humans crossed the Bering Strait and reached the New World and the reason archeologists were able to figure this out was because of the art the people created while passing through; such as cave art, baskets and stone weapons. Then after hundreds of years of spreading out across the continents in the western hemisphere, each group began to remain sedentary, so cultures such as the eskimos up north, the cliff dwelling basket makers in the Rocky Mountains, the citadel hunter/gatherers in Mexico or the Incas in the south began to gain different customs and social behaviors such as religion, hierarchies and ways of maintaining one's home and group. Through the work assembled by the patient and tireless efforts of the excavators, scientists, photographers and artist, Elizabeth Baity creates a book that goes into great deal explaining the process of how those ancient cultures came to be, and how modern day people were able to discover and learn about them.

References

 http://www.goodreads.com/book/show/813753.Americans_Before_Columbus 
 https://www.kirkusreviews.com/book-reviews/elizabeth-chesley-baity-2/americans-before-columbus/

1951 children's books
American children's books
Children's history books
Pre-Columbian studies books
Newbery Honor-winning works
Viking Press books